Stagira is a genus of cicadas in the family Cicadidae. There are at least 30 described species in Stagira.

Species
These 39 species belong to the genus Stagira:

 Stagira abagnata Villet, 1997 c g
 Stagira acrida (Walker, F., 1850) c g
 Stagira aethlius (Walker, F., 1850) c g
 Stagira caffrariensis Villet, 1997 c g
 Stagira celsus Villet, 1997 c g
 Stagira chloana Villet, 1997 c g
 Stagira consobrina (Distant, 1920) c g
 Stagira consobrinoides Villet, 1997 c g
 Stagira dendrophila Villet, 1997 c g
 Stagira dracomontana Villet, 1997 c g
 Stagira dracomontanoides Villet, 1997 c g
 Stagira elegans Villet, 1997 c g
 Stagira empangeniensis Villet, 1997 c g
 Stagira enigmatica Villet, 1997 c g
 Stagira eshowiensis Villet, 1997 c g
 Stagira furculata Villet, 1997 c g
 Stagira fuscula Villet, 1997 c g
 Stagira microcephala (Walker, F., 1850) c g
 Stagira mystica Villet, 1997 c g
 Stagira nasuta Villet, 1997 c g
 Stagira natalensis Villet, 1997 c g
 Stagira ngomiensis Villet, 1997 c g
 Stagira nkandlhaensis Villet, 1997 c g
 Stagira oxyclypea Villet, 1997 c g
 Stagira pondoensis Villet, 1997 c g
 Stagira pseudaethlius Villet, 1997 c g
 Stagira purpurea Villet, 1997 c g
 Stagira segmentaria Karsch, 1890 c g
 Stagira selindensis Villet, 1997 c g
 Stagira sexcostata Villet, 1997 c g
 Stagira simplex (Germar, 1834) c g
 Stagira stygia Villet, 1997 c g
 Stagira sylvia Villet, 1997 c g
 Stagira virescens Kirkaldy, 1909 c g
 Stagira viridoptera Villet, 1997 c g
 Stagira vulgata Villet, 1997 c g
 Stagira xenomorpha Villet, 1997 c g
 Stagira zebrata Villet, 1997 c g
 Stagira zuluensis Villet, 1997 c g

Data sources: i = ITIS, c = Catalogue of Life, g = GBIF, b = Bugguide.net

References

Further reading

 
 
 
 

Tettigomyiini
Cicadidae genera